Isaak Ah Mau (born 25 November 1982) is a former Samoa international rugby league footballer who played as a  for the North Queensland Cowboys and the Brisbane Broncos in the NRL.

Background
Ah Mau was born in Auckland, New Zealand.

He is the brother of Leeson Ah Mau.

Playing career
Ah Mau played junior rugby league with the Otahuhu Leopards in New Zealand. He debuted for the Brisbane Broncos in the NRL in 2008 after playing for the Ipswich Jets in the Queensland Cup. The following season he remained with the Broncos but played for their Queensland Cup feeder side, Easts Tigers.

He signed with the North Queensland Cowboys for the 2010 and 2011 seasons. Ah Mau also played for the Mackay Cutters in the Queensland Cup. His contract with the Cowboys expired at the end of the 2011 season, and he left the club having appeared in five NRL matches. Isaak was involved in the 2013 Tertiary Student Rugby League World Cup playing for Australia having won the grand final 16-26 over England.

References

1982 births
Living people
Brisbane Broncos players
Eastern Suburbs Tigers players
Expatriate rugby league players in Australia
Mackay Cutters players
New Zealand expatriate rugby league players
New Zealand expatriate sportspeople in Australia
New Zealand people of Chinese descent
New Zealand sportspeople of Samoan descent
New Zealand rugby league players
North Queensland Cowboys players
Otahuhu Leopards players
Papatoetoe Panthers players
Redcliffe Dolphins players
Rugby league players from Auckland
Rugby league props
Samoa national rugby league team players